Karl Paul Kristian Gylche (30 January 1890 – 15 November 1944) was a detective of the Danish police force who died in the Buchenwald concentration camp following the deportation of the Danish police. He is the father of Preben Gylche and brother of Vilhelm Gylche.

Biography 
Karl Paul Kristian Gylche was born 30 January 1890 in either Halmstad, Sweden or Copenhagen, Denmark as the third child to bookbinder Axel Jørgen Wilhelm Gylche and wife Oline Josefine Wilhemine née Kristensen and baptized 17 September the same year.

He was confirmed in Trinitatis Church on the nineteenth Sunday after Trinity in 1904, while residing with his parents in Store Brøndstræde 14-II, Copenhagen. The two previous years his older brothers had been confirmed in the same church, with the family residing at the same address.

After his confirmation he started working as a delivery boy, with frequent address changes in Copenhagen, until he in 1915 became a police man.

By 1921 he had married and moved to a third floor apartment in Arnesvej 19, where he lived in 1922 when his wife died.

On 13 December 1925 in Brønshøj church he married the nine-year younger divorced cigar worker Merry Kirsten Rosenberg née Petersen. Six months prior to the wedding his wife had given birth to their daughter, who on 26 December that year was baptized Lilian Gylche in the same church.

In 1927 he had a son, Preben Gylche, who would become a member of the resistance.

The family lived in their apartment on Arnesvej 19 until 1934, where they had moved to Nordre Fasanvej 192.

In 1937 the family moved again, to Hillerødgade 92, Copenhagen with Gylche working as a police detective.

On 19 September 1944 the German occupation force began their deportation of the Danish police including Gylche who at the time was 54 years old.

On 15 November 1944 Gylche died of Erysipelas in the Buchenwald concentration camp.

After his death 

Gylche was buried in Bispebjerg Cemetery on 19 September 1945, one year after the arrest of the Danish police.

References 

1890 births
1944 deaths
Danish police officers
Danish people of World War II
Danish people who died in Buchenwald concentration camp